Public-benefit corporation may refer to several types of corporate entity:

United Kingdom
 public benefit corporation, the legal form of NHS foundation trusts

United States
 Benefit corporation or public-benefit corporation, for profit but with positive impact
 Public-benefit nonprofit corporation, chartered by a state government
 New York state public-benefit corporations, quasi-governmental authorities